Punam Yadav (9 July 1995) is an Indian weightlifter who  won Bronze medal in the women's 63 kg weight class at the 2014 Commonwealth Games at Glasgow, where the gold medal was won by Olauwatoyin Adesanmi of Nigeria. She also won a gold medal at the 2018 Commonwealth Games held in Gold Coast, Australia.

Early life
The daughter of a small farmer Punam grew up lending a helping hand to her parents in a Benaras village. After three years of intense training to become an international weightlifter, when Punam finally got a chance to represent India at the 2014 Commonwealth Games, her parents lacked the fund to support her. So her father sold their family buffalo to fund Punam’s trip. With her devotion and extreme efforts reached the height of success in such state like uttar pradesh where sports as a carrier is imissible in this scenario being a girl of obc taking a carrier as future aspect was very much challenging. 
She also joined BHU KASHI VIDHYA PEETH for her under  graduate courses.

Yash Bharti Award 
Punam was given Yash Bharati award by Government of Uttar Pradesh in 2015 for weightlifting.

Career
She won the gold medal by lifting a total of 222 kg: 100 kg in Snatch and 122 kg in Clean and jerk in 2018 Commonwealth Games in women's 69 kg division.
She had won bronze medal in 2014 Commonwealth Games by lifting a total weight of 202 kg, 88 kg in snatch and 114 kg in Clean and jerk. She went for undergraduate course at varanasi kashi vidhya peeth.

References

External links
List of Medal winners at Commonwealth Games Glasgow 2014

Living people
1994 births
Sportspeople from Varanasi
Indian female weightlifters
Weightlifters at the 2014 Asian Games
Asian Games competitors for India
Weightlifters at the 2014 Commonwealth Games
Weightlifters at the 2018 Commonwealth Games
Weightlifters at the 2022 Commonwealth Games
Commonwealth Games gold medallists for India
Commonwealth Games bronze medallists for India
Commonwealth Games medallists in weightlifting
Sportswomen from Uttar Pradesh
21st-century Indian women
21st-century Indian people
Medallists at the 2014 Commonwealth Games
Medallists at the 2018 Commonwealth Games